SS Otto Petersen was one of three ships ordered by the Vendila Steamboat Company (Svendsen & Christensen). The others were E.M. Dalgas and P.N. Damm.

SS Otto Petersen was built at the Elsinor Ironship and Machine Factory, Helsingør, Copenhagen in 1930. Once a significant shipyard that helped boost Denmark into an international maritime nation, Elsinore Shipyard closed in the 80's - a small dry dock remains.

Her captain for 24 years, Knud Valdemar Goth (1893 - 1966) joined Vendila around 1920.

SS Otto Petersen was blown in two when a mine went off in Drammen Fiord, Norway on 12 January 1945. She was raised and towed to Nakskov for repairs.  In 1954 Otto Petersen was sold to Haverbeck & Skalweit, Chile and renamed Tornagaleones.

Footnotes

1930 ships
Ships built in Helsingør
Merchant ships of Denmark
Steamships of Denmark
World War II merchant ships of Denmark
Maritime incidents in January 1945
Merchant ships of Chile
Steamships of Chile